The New Hampshire Interscholastic Athletic Association (NHIAA) is the governing body for sports competitions among all public and some private high schools in New Hampshire.  It is a member of the National Federation of State High School Associations.

Classifications

Schools competing under the NHIAA are grouped into four divisions:

 Division I: over 900 students
 Division II: 550-899 students
 Division III: 286-524 students
 Division IV: up to 285 students

Schools are reclassified every two years.  The classification thresholds are periodically adjusted so as to result in an approximately equal number of teams in each class.  Schools may petition the NHIAA to play in a class higher than that in which they would otherwise be placed.

For some sports (e.g. football or ice hockey), competition is not organized based on school class, but based on divisions established by the NHIAA committee governing the individual sport.

Classifications for the 2022-2023 and 2023-2024 seasons are as follows:

Division I (formerly Class L)

Division II (formerly Class I)

Division III (formerly Class M)

Division IV (formerly Class S)

Sports

The NHIAA sanctions competitions in the following sports:

Fall season

Winter season

Spring season

See also
 NHIAA Football

References

External links
 Official site
 2022-2023 NHIAA Handbook

Organizations based in New Hampshire
Sports organizations established in 1946
High school sports in New Hampshire
High school sports associations in the United States
1947 establishments in New Hampshire